The Gunpowder River is a  tidal inlet on the western side of Chesapeake Bay in Maryland, United States. It is formed by the joining of two freshwater rivers, Gunpowder Falls (often referred to locally as "Big Gunpowder Falls") and Little Gunpowder Falls.

Gunpowder Falls
From there, the Gunpowder flows in a generally southeast direction through the length of Baltimore County  past the Perry Hall Mansion and the site of its former plantation  until it reaches Joppatowne where it is joined by the Little Gunpowder and the Bird River, becoming simply the "Gunpowder River" once it passes the Amtrak train bridge that joins Chase and Joppatowne. The nearby site of old Joppa was an important deep-water seaport, and rival to the port of Baltimore, in colonial American times, until sedimentation of the Gunpowder River -- caused by upstream development --  made its harbor inaccessible to large ships.

Little Gunpowder Falls
Little Gunpowder Falls, as its name implies, is much smaller than the mainstem Gunpowder Falls. Throughout its  length, it forms much of the boundary between eastern Baltimore County and western Harford County until it reaches the Big Gunpowder. The headquarters of the Gunpowder Falls State Park is located in Harford County along the bank of the Little Gunpowder Falls, in the historic Jerusalem Mill Village.  The remainder of the boundary between Baltimore and Harford counties is formed by the Gunpowder River, the tidal estuary of the Chesapeake Bay formed by the union of Little Gunpowder Falls and the Gunpowder Falls rivers.

Recreation
Both the Gunpowder and Little Gunpowder Falls flow through hilly agricultural and forest land for much of their length. In fact, there are no less than four separate state parks that form Gunpowder Falls State Park, the largest state park in Maryland. At two points, Gunpowder Falls is dammed to form major reservoirs for the Baltimore metropolitan area: Prettyboy Reservoir and Loch Raven Reservoir. By the time the Gunpowder reaches the Bay, however, it is no longer a rural river, but a suburban river that passes under Interstate 95 and many bedroom communities for Baltimore. Nonetheless, Gunpowder State Park on the Chesapeake Bay may give one the impression that this is still a somewhat remote river.

Both streams flow over the Fall Line separating the Piedmont Plateau from the Atlantic Coastal Plain just downstream of US Route 1.  This creates some class III whitewater opportunities for kayakers and canoeists when the water is reasonably high.

Tributaries
Minebank Run
Long Green Creek
Sweathouse Run
Haystack Branch
Jennifer Branch
Bean Run
Foster Branch
Taylor Creek
Broad Run

See also
List of Maryland rivers
List of rivers of Pennsylvania
List of parks in the Baltimore–Washington metropolitan area

References

External links
Baltimore County Watershed Management Program
Little Gunpowder Falls Watershed
Lower Gunpowder Falls Watershed

Rivers of Baltimore County, Maryland
Tributaries of the Chesapeake Bay
Rivers of Harford County, Maryland
Rivers of Maryland
Rivers of Pennsylvania
Rivers of York County, Pennsylvania